Porcellio albinus is a species of woodlouse in the genus Porcellio belonging to the family Porcellionidae that can be found in North Africa.

References

Porcellionidae
Arthropods of Africa
Invertebrates of North Africa
Crustaceans described in 1885